The Skills Framework for the Information Age (SFIA, pronounced Sofia) is the global skills and competency framework for the digital world. It is a model for describing and managing skills and competencies for professionals working in information and communications technology (ICT), software engineering, and digital transformation. It is a global common language for describing skills and competencies in the digital world. SFIA was first published in 2000, created by a consortium of many organizations, spearheaded by the British Computer Society (BCS). Since its first publication, SFIA has been regularly refreshed and updated every 3 years to reflect the evolving needs of international industry and business.

SFIA has gained global use in over 180 countries due to it being straightforward, generic and universally applicable.  It is now available in 10 languages: English, Spanish, German, French, Italian, Arabic, Japanese, Chinese, French Canadian and Polish with a number of additional languages requested. The structure is well established and respected and many other frameworks, including several outside of ICT and digital transformation have either been inspired by SFIA or are aligning to it.

The SFIA Foundation, a global not-for-profit foundation, was formed to oversee the continued development of the SFIA Framework and to support the global ecosystem that has evolved to support SFIA use world-wide.

SFIA remains a collaboration - it is updated through a process of open global consultation so is built for industry by industry itself - it is simply impossible now to list all the organisations, individuals and countries that have contributed to the content of SFIA - making it a truly globally accepted common language for skills and competencies for the digital world.

The current published version of the SFIA Framework is version 8. SFIA 8 was published in September 2021 and is available from the SFIA Foundation website www.sfia-online.org.

The SFIA Foundation 

The SFIA Foundation, is a not-for-profit organisation established to oversee the development of the framework. There is a Governance Board comprising the Institution of Engineering and Technology, the British Computer Society, IMIS and the itSMF (UK). There are currently vacancies for international representation on the SFIA Board.

The SFIA Foundation is run by its General Manager (Ian Seward), the update of the framework is led by the Update Manager (Peter Leather).

The SFIA Council is made up of representatives from many countries and oversees the development of the Framework and provides advice to the SFIA General Manager in support of the global ecosystem.

The SFIA Design Authority Board is a group of individuals from several countries that ensures the framework is developed inline with its design principles and that quality and integrity is maintained. As with previous versions of SFIA, the updates to the SFIA Framework have been as a result of a global consultation process of change requests, discussion, drafting and review involving a great many users (for the SFIA 7 update this comprised over 140 countries).  The global Design Authority Board approves updates to the framework. The process of consultation is continuous and this is coordinated by Ian Seward (SFIA General Manager and SFIA Design Authority Chairman) and Peter Leather (SFIA Update Manager and Independent Consultant, SME).

Due to the open consultation approach of its development and the fact that the framework is actually drafted by its industrial user base the SFIA Framework it is effectively 'owned' by global the user base.

The SFIA Framework

The SFIA Framework is an enabler for people who manage resources for ICT, Software Engineering and Digital Transformation and is independent of technology, method or approach. It is a common reference model, a common language, comprising 7 Levels of Responsibility with 102 Professional Skills or competencies.  The Levels of Responsibility are key as they reflect the reality in industry where skills are practiced at different levels of responsibility.

SFIA is an experience framework - you have a skill or competence at a level of responsibility because you have practiced the skill or competence at that level in a real-world situation.

SFIA's seven Levels of Responsibility are characterised in terms of Generic Attributes (of Autonomy, Influence, Complexity, Knowledge and Business Skills). From a Professional Services perspective, responsibility levels 2-6 can be thought of anecdotally as: Associate professional, Professional, Senior professional, Principal professional, and Lead professional.

Each of the 121 Professional Skills or competencies comprises a skill description and a description of the skill practiced at one or more of the 7 Levels of Responsibility.

To aid navigation within the framework the skills and competencies are organised into 6 categories: Strategy and Architecture; Change and Transformation; Development and Implementation; Delivery and Operation; People and Skills; and Relationships and Engagement.

More recently, to help address particular environments different views of SFIA have been developed to organise the skills and competencies into the alternative SFIA Views; these include a Software Engineering View, a Digital Transformation View, a DevOps View, a Big Data and Data Science View. Other SFIA Views are in development including a Cyber Security View.

Levels of Responsibility

The Levels of Responsibility run from Level 1 (the lowest level of responsibility) to Level 7 (the highest level of responsibility). Each level is given a simple phrase description (Follow; Assist; Apply; Enable; Ensure and advise; Initiate and influence; and Set strategy, inspire and mobilise) and each level is described using a number of generic attributes (autonomy, influence, complexity, knowledge and business skills). A summary of the levels is given below:

 1. Follow
 Basic capability to complete tasks under close supervision. Not expected to use much initiative.  Should be organised.
 2. Assist
 Uses some discretion and has a wider circle of interaction than level 1, especially in speciality.  Works on a range of tasks, and proactively manages personal development.
 3. Apply
 Complete work packages with milestone reviews only. Escalates problems under own discretion. Works with suppliers and customers. May have some supervisory responsibility.  Performs a broad range of tasks, takes initiative, and schedules own and others work.
 4. Enable
 Works under general direction in a framework.  Influence at account level, works on a broad range of complex activities. Good level of operational business skills.
 5. Ensure and advise
 Broad direction, supervisory, objective setting responsibility. Influences organisation. Challenging and unpredictable work.  Self sufficient in business skills.
 6. Initiate and influence
 Authority for an area of work. Sets organisational objectives. Influences policy, significant part of organisation, and customers and suppliers at a high level. Highly complex and strategic work. Initiates and leads technical and business change.
 7. Set strategy, inspire, and mobilise
 Authority includes setting policy. Makes decisions critical to organisation, influences key suppliers and customers at top level. Leads on strategy.  Full range of management and leadership skills.

Professional Skills
The competencies are grouped into categories and sub-categories. The categories are:

 Strategy and architecture
 Change and transformation
 Development and implementation
 Delivery and operation
 Skills and quality
 Relationships and engagement

Benefits of SFIA 
SFIA alone does not deliver any business benefits, however, it does create a foundation to leverage and create additional value to the organization. Benefits of SFIA can include:

 Enable ICT and the broader Business to work toward similar goals
 Can provide a clear understanding of standardized, leveled ICT skills across the organization
 Enable targeted training, to address specific skill gaps
 Improve ICT recruitment
 Assist with Performance Development of existing staff

References

External links
 SFIA Foundation

Information technology management
British Computer Society